Live at Montreux is a DVD/Blu-ray/CD release from Canadian singer-songwriter Alanis Morissette released on April 22, 2013. The DVD/Blu-ray was filmed at Montreux Jazz Festival, Switzerland. The concert was recorded as part of Morissette's Guardian Angel Tour, thus she performed several songs from the album Havoc and Bright Lights, which had not yet been released at the time.

Track listing

DVD and Blu-ray
"I Remain" (Segue 1)
"Woman Down"
"All I Really Want"
"You Learn"
"Guardian"
"Flinch"
"Forgiven"*
"Hands Clean"
"I Remain" (Segue 2)
"Citizen of the Planet"
"Ironic"
"Havoc"
"Head Over Feet"
"Versions of Violence"
"I Remain" (Segue 3)
"You Oughta Know"
"Numb"
"Hand in My Pocket"
"Uninvited"
"Thank U"

CD
"I Remain"
"Woman Down"
"All I Really Want"
"You Learn"
"Guardian"
"Flinch"
"Hands Clean"
"Ironic"
"Havoc"
"Head Over Feet"
"Versions of Violence"
"You Oughta Know"
"Numb"
"Hand in My Pocket"
"Thank U"

Personnel
 Alanis Morissette – vocals
 Julian Coryell – guitars
 Cedric Lemoyne – bass
 Jason Orme – guitars
 Victor Indrizzo – drums
 Michael Farrell – keyboards

Charts

References

Alanis Morissette video albums
2013 live albums
Live video albums
2013 video albums
Eagle Rock Entertainment live albums
Eagle Rock Entertainment video albums
albums recorded at the Montreux Jazz Festival